These are the official results of the Men's Team Time Trial at the 1960 Summer Olympics in Rome, Italy, held on 26 August 1960. There were 126 participants from 32 nations.

The event, which was held in extremely hot conditions, was marred by the death of Knud Enemark Jensen, who collapsed from sunstroke and suffered a fractured skull. It was later determined that before the race Jensen had taken Ronicol, a blood circulation stimulant.

Final classification

References

Cycling at the Summer Olympics – Men's team time trial
Road cycling at the 1960 Summer Olympics